The Congo Trade Center is a skyscraper and shopping centre located in Gombe downtown Kinshasa, Democratic Republic of the Congo. The Congo Trade Center has 18 floors. The building houses a 5-Star hotel, offices , Shopping mall, Banquet hall, Six restaurants and a Casino.
The building configuration had been originally designed to comprise two car park basement floors, approximately 2,400m² in area, double floor height, double-level, Retail Space, approximately 1,200m² in area on Ground Floor, two public floors comprising spaces such as Hotel Lobbies, Front-Of-House (FOH) and Administration in Tower A, of approximately 5,000m², eleven 209-key, 5-star Hotel, amounting to 14,430m² area in Tower A and four hotel guestroom floors in Tower B with twelve office floors above).

References

External links

 http://www.hamilton-pm.com

Buildings and structures in Kinshasa
Lukunga District